Balanica is a cave complex and paleoarchaeological site in the City of Niš' municipality of Niška Banja in southeast Serbia. It consists of Velika Balanica and Mala Balanica (meaning Great and Little Balanica). A third cave, Pešturina, is also nearby. The two Balanica caves extend parallel to each other, likely being connected at the rear.

In 2006, remains of Homo heidelbergensis were discovered in Mala Balanica. Estimated to be up to 525,000 years old, it was the oldest hominin remains discovery in Serbia and third oldest in Europe at the time. During the last Interglacial period, 130,000-70,000 BP, the Neanderthals thrived. They lived all over the Balkans, including Balanica. Apart from Pešturina, in the wider Balanica region, evidence of the Neanderthal presence was discovered in the localities of Meča Dupka, Golema Dupka, and Kremenac, all in the Niš and Leskovac depressions, and on the slopes of the Radan mountain.

In 2022, Neanderthal remains were discovered in Velika Balanica. Estimated to be 300,000 years old, they are the oldest Neanderthal remains in eastern Europe, and second oldest hominin remains discovered so far in Serbia. This place it in the Middle Pleistocene, quite early in the Neanderthal evolution, and points to the expansion from the west. This makes it one of the oldest localities in Europe where transition from the Lower Paleolithic into the Middle one is recorded. The caves also confirm that the Balkan Peninsula, due to its geographical location, was always an important crossroads, and a migration corridor even for archaic humans, connecting continents already 300,000 years ago. Different hominin morphologies survived and coexisted in the area, making the Balkans a "hotspot of biodiversity".

Due to its importance, the Balanica complex and the Pešturina cave are sometimes nicknamed Serbian Atapuerca, being compared to the Spanish Atapuerca, On 10 May 2022, the Government of Serbia placed two Balanica caves under the protection as a cultural monument. They were officially declared an archaeological site under the name "Locality of Velika and Mala Balanica in Sićevo".

Location and geography 

There are three caves in a row, all within the Sićevo Gorge region. The third is Pešturina cave, several kilometers away. All three contain hominin remains, including Neanderthal's in Pešturina. The caves are inaccessible by roads or paths and can be reached only via ropes. Access starts at the southern exit from the village of Sićevo, where the ropes descend below the village's football field. All caves are locked and are opened only when excavations are conducted. The entrances into the caves face south, across the gorge, but overlooking to the west, and the wide South Morava Valley.

The caves represent typical karstic cavities. They are located on the Sićevo's state owned cadastre lot No. 6720/1, on the southern slope of the gorge's Brljaski Kamen section, above the right bank of the Nišava river.

Discovery 

The caves in the surroundings of Niš attracted archaeologists already at the end of the 19th century, few decades after science adopted theories of evolution and glaciation. However, Balanica and Pešturina caves were discovered during the survey of the terrain for the construction of the Niš-Dimitrovgrad motorway, at the beginning of the 21st century. Balanica caves were discovered in 2002. Archaeological importance of the caves came to light when the local gold rush hit the area. Gold prospectors used the caves as bivouac shelters. They were discovering abundant quantity of artefacts and various remains, which prompted paleoarchaeologists to begin surveys.

Excavations in Belanica began in 2004, led by Dušan Mihailović from the University of Belgrade Faculty of Philosophy. Researchers from the Canadian University of Winnipeg, headed by Mirjana Roksandic, joined Serbian scientists in 2009. It was evident from the start that the localities are important archaeological sources as numerous artefacts, fireplaces, fauna and hominin remains were soon discovered.

Mala Balanica

Geography 

Hominins 

In 2006 remains of Homo heidelbergensis were discovered. It was a hemi-mandible, named BH-1. Originally, the researchers were unable to assign it to a specific hominin species. The CT scanning was conducted to create a 3D image of the mandible, while the U-series method of radiometric dating was originally used to determine the jaw's age. Due to the limitation of the process, and some unusual readings, it was tentatively dated to 113,000+72,000-43,000 years, as older specimen was never discovered in this part of Europe. This was set as the minimum age.

It was the first hominin specimen in the Central Balkans recovered through controlled excavations with firm stratigraphic context. All three molars are present in their sockets. The lower half of the mesiolingual root of the third molar is missing and the remaining roots are exposed due to the destruction of the adjacent endomandibular lamina. The mesial section of the mandible shows an old breakage filled with sediment, whereas all of the breaks on the distal end are fresh.

The presence of the alveolar planum (the distance from the frontmost tooth socket to the back of the jaw), and the overall robusticity indicated a non-modern morphology and primitive character states comparable with the Early Pleistocene. Despite relative geographic proximity and possible contemporaneity with the Krapina Neanderthals, the mandible does not share any observable derived Neanderthal traits. As it didn't appear to be Neanderthal, but more archaic, the mandible was originally described as belonging to the generic archaic Homo sp. Shape of the dental arcade and molar morphology placed the remains in the genus Homo, but its fragmentary nature and plesiomorphic character of its traits precluded a more precise taxonomic designation.

However, the 2013 survey which included electron spin resonance combined with uranium series isotopic analysis, and infrared/post-infrared luminescence dating, provided a minimum age between 397,000 and 525,000 years. Measurements have been conducted by the University of Bordeaux in France, and Université du Québec à Montréal in Canada. Though some results, especially of the sediments where the mandible was discovered, showed results of older periods, up to 602,000 years old (582,000 in sediments above the mandible), the researchers concluded from other facts and circumstances that this is probably not the case, settling on the lower range. The remains are now fully assigned to Homo heidelbergensis, which was later corroborated by the detailed dental survey.

Even the lower range places Mala Balanica among the oldest hominin fossils in Europe. Its older estimate overlaps with Sima de los Huesos in Spain (600,000 BP± 60,000) and is slightly younger than Mauer in Germany (609,000 BP± 40,000). Younger minimum age limit overlaps with Arago in France (435,000 BP± 85,000) and Visogliano in Italy (350,000–500,000). It is somewhat older than Ceprano (353,000 BP± 4,000), also in Italy. As for the surrounding region, there are only two other Middle Pleistocene specimens, Petralona and Apidima, both in Greece, but both are notably younger.

Except for the Visogliano remains, which are identified as Homo erectus, all other human remains are currently identified as Homo heidelbergensis. The Heidelberg man is considered a chronospecies of Neanderthals, at least in the European context. However, the contemporary Middle Pleistocene hominin population in Western Europe shows unequal presence of Neanderthal traits. While in the Sima de los Huesos Neanderthal morphology is more pronounced, in the eastern Arago and Ceprano localities not so much. Robin Dennell suggested that Neanderthals were evolving in Western Europe during glacial isolation periods, but in warmer periods more primitive species which remained in the Balkans, and south generally, would repopulate the west, reasserting their traits. For example, Mala Balanica's mandible shows absolutely no Neanderthal morphological traits. Hence the discrepancy between the common traits among the contemporary populations as Homo heidelbergensis constantly "diluted" Homo neanderthalensis in its beginnings. The Balkans remained connected to Southwest Asia even during the ice age and served as a transit route. Much later, fully evolved Neanderthals would migrate to the east.

Velika Balanica

Archaeology 

Originally,  was accessible, with several buried corridors which lead into further, later uncovered, halls. Level 1 is sterile. Typical Mousterian artefacts are found throughout the 2nd layer, while the Charentian industries were discovered in the entire layer 3. Layers 4 and 5 are still being surveyed.

Lithic assemblages from the Charentian period in both caves, and remains of microfauna, suggest that layer 3a corresponds to the late Middle Pleistocene, probably the interglacial Marine Isotope Stages 9 or 7. Taking into the account the Proto-Charentian character of industry, and parallels with Karain Cave in Turkey, this would put the layer 3a at 330,000-300,000 BP.

Fauna 

Among herbivores, the most represented are the remains of Alpine ibex and red deer, followed by chamois. They are present in all layers' 2 and 3 sub-layers. Bones of forest rhinoceros are found in some of the sub-levels of both layers, while wild horse, aurochs and steppe bison are represented only in the layer 3. Carnivores are much less represented, including remains of European wildcat in sub-layer 2a, cave bear in 2a and 2-b, and wolf in 3b and 3c. Remains of red fox were also found.

Based on the topographic cliff-like location of the cave, abundance of ibex and chamois remains is expected. Predators belong to the typical grassland and forested environments, which corresponds to the moderate temperatures and presumed paleo-environment in the interglacial Marine Isotope Stages 7 to 9. It is believed that primary food source were deer and ibex, while other large fauna had secondary role. This points to a certain level of specialization in hunting, with focus on more productive animals. Sub-layer 2 indicate summer use of the cave and a clearly specialized economy which included summer hunting of young deer, grazing in herds in the Morava's fluvial plain. By contrast, ibex and chamois were living around the site, on the gorge's cliffs. This points to the low role of large mammals in diet, which is generally narrow and heavily influenced by the location of the cave.

Unlike other Neanderthal groups, the main focus of Balanica residents was not the large game, as those animals lived in the river plains, far from the cave, which caused logistic problems of transporting large carcasses back into the cave. Failure in developing efficient transportation strategy of large animals may indicate sub-optimal behavior. Consequently, the paleo-economy practiced by the inhabitants of Velika Balanica was less efficient than the one observed in other Upper Paleolithic records. Still, the logistic mobility of the settlers was apparently rather high, which points to the intense residential use of the cave.

The taphonomical analysis points towards an anthropogenic origin of the deposit, i.e., the remains were brought into the cave by humans, rather than animals living and dying in the cave. Biostratinomic and diagenetic alterations in the assemblage include the abundance of butchery and breakage marks, with thermoalterations (treatment by fire) confirming this. There is abundant evidence (including fragmentation and use of fire) of marrow extraction. Especially the long bones of red deer and ibex were intensively exploited to obtain marrow grease.

Tools 

Observing skeletal elements in the assemblage (77% appendicular skeleton, 15% teeth, 14% axial skeleton, 9% heads), it points towards a mayor contribution of high-utility parts. Tools found among the hominin remains are almost identical to the tools found in Middle East at that period pointing to the contact or even mixing of two populations. Remains, originating from the Middle Paleolithic, include numerous artefacts, fauna remains and hearths. Also found were stone tools for leather processing, or Quina type grattoir de côté.

Specifically, stone tools from Velika and Mala Balanica caves show a distinctive assortment of characteristics, like large flakes with at least one blunt margin, distinctive scalar Quina retouch, extensive reworking of scrapers, and the predominance of scrapers in the assemblage. These characteristics are not noticed in the similarly dated assemblages from the surrounding region. They show strong similarities with the contemporaneous Yabrudian facies of the Acheulo-Yabrudian complex. These findings strongly suggest movement of population, and possible cultural interactions between Southwest Asia (Levant) and the Balkans during the Chibanian.

The tools were used for butchering of animals, including skinning, dismembering and defleshing of bones, leaving butchering and cut marks on the bones, which are in 90% of cases limb bones.  Some 30% of total bones was manually hit whilst fresh, producing oblique angles and curved profiles. On many, hammerstone percussions were identified, with flake scars and splinters. Almost one third of the bones was treated by fire. Such abundance of burnt traces may be a result of intense cooking, or cleaning the living floors in the cave.

Hominins 

During the summer of 2017, four teeth were discovered. The first tooth was discovered by the student Ljubica Stajić. They are three adult teeth and one child's (a six-year molar), belonging to at least two persons. Dated to the Chibanian period, they were estimated to be 300,000 years old. That makes them the oldest Neanderthal remains outside of western Europe, indicating massive migration to the east, or the Eastern Mediterranean Area. The more precise thermoluminescence dating places them between 285,000 BP+ 34,000 and 295,000 BP+ 74,000. Additionally, they are the second oldest hominin remains in Serbia after those from Mala Balanica. The teeth were found among the remains of the hearth, in the archaeological layer 3a. Examination of the remains showed that they bear the closest resemblance to 430,000 years old Neanderthal remains from Atapuerca's site Sima de los Huesos, in Spain.

Assessment 

The Middle Pleistocene is becoming increasingly recognized as an important period in the biocultural evolution of humans. Characteristics of the period include exaggerated encephalization, controlled use of fire, temperate zone geographic dispersals, varieties of prepared core lithic reduction techniques, development of effective weaponry (both predatory and defensive), and regional differentiation of human populations. Remains in Velika Balanica make it one of the oldest localities in Europe where transition from the Lower Paleolithic into the Middle one is recorded. The transition was marked by the controlled use of fire, and organized hunting. This corresponds with sudden elevation of cognitive abilities of human ancestors, and the process of encephalization.

The Middle and Late Pleistocene specimen from western Europe show derived Neandertal traits, however, this is different for the eastern and the southern Europe. It appears that Mediterranean peninsulas served as areas of refuge, potentially playing an important role in maintaining the variability of hominins in the continent, by a combination of migratory pulses and in situ evolution. Hence, population of Europe in the Pleistocene may have been more complex than previously thought. Based on the fossil records, the reasons may include any number of different genetic processes including drift, founder effect, directional adaptation and hybridization.

The remains coincide with the period when humans began their permanent presence in Europe. Unlike west European Heidelberg man, remains from Mala Balanica have no Neanderthal elements. It indicates that in colder periods, the Balkans wasn't isolated from the rest of Eurasia, like the western Europe was. Scientists predicted that at some point humanoid remains would also be discovered in Velka Balanica, which happened in 2017. The Balkans served not only as a refugium in the ice age periods, but after the glaciers retreated, contributed to 80% of animal and plant species that repopulated Western Europe, and 100% of all the species that repopulated Eastern Europe.

The findings in both Balanica caves point to possible contact between the Balkans and Middle Eastern hominin populations some 300,000 to 240,000 years ago. A number of questions remain open: What was the exact method of dissemination of the cultural innovations? Were those migrations of people or exchange of ideas, and who was the initial carrier of the original technologies? At this moment, it is not even clear which species of hominins made contact. It could be meeting of European and Middle Eastern Neanderthals, or the meeting of regional Neanderthals with ancestors of modern humans.

The mandible from Mala Balanica is the easternmost hominin specimen in Europe dated to the Middle Pleistocene. Inferences drawn from the morphology place it outside currently observed variation of European Homo heidelbergensis. The lack of derived Neandertal traits, comparison to the contemporary specimens in Southeast Europe, like Kocabaş, Vasogliano and Ceprano, and coupled with Middle Pleistocene synapomorphies, suggest different evolutionary forces shaped ancient residents in the east of the continent where isolation did not play such an important role during glaciations.

Excavations are ongoing in both caves, as the bedrock still has not been reached. The hominin remains are curated at the National Museum of Serbia in Belgrade.

Protection 

The Government of Serbia made a decision No. 05 633–27622012 on 10 May 2022 to place the caves under the protection as "Locality of Velika and Mala Balanica in Sićevo". They were declared an official archaeological site and immovable cultural monument. The decision was published in the State Gazette No. 50/12 on 18 May. It was registered in the local register of the Institute for the Protection of Cultural Monuments Niš on 28 May 2012 (designation AN 53), with the institute being placed in charge of the administration over the protected area. The monument was inducted in the state register of cultural monuments on 17 August 2012, under the designation AN 165.

See also 
 Pešturina

References

Sources 

 
 
 
 
 
 
 
 
 
 
 

Caves of Serbia
Nišava District
Prehistoric sites in Serbia
Archaeological sites in Serbia
Protected Archaeological Sites
Paleolithic
Neanderthal sites
Homo heidelbergensis fossils
Mousterian
2004 archaeological discoveries